Paul Harney was born on October 21, 1850, in New Orleans, the son of Paul and Susan Ferris Harney.  They moved to St. Louis when he was very young. He was an early student of artist Alban Jasper Conant, a painter of Abraham Lincoln, and later studied art at the National Academy in New York and the Royal Academy in Munich under Barth and Lindenschmit.

Harney settled in Alton, Illinois and taught as a member of the faculty at Shurtleff College.  After twenty years as both faculty and as Shurtleff's Director of Art, he moved to the Missouri side of the Mississippi River along with his wife Emma Stewart and his three children (his son Eliot had died while still in Alton).
For several years Harney occupied a chair in the St. Louis School of Fine Arts at Washington University in St. Louis.  He was a founding member of the St. Louis Artists' Guild and a member of the Society of Western Arts.

Several unfortunate tragedies beset Harney's later years. All three of his remaining children died between 1906 and 1907 (Howard, Estelle Harney Hauskins, and Paul,) along with his wife, who died in 1910. Harney died poverty stricken of tuberculosis on November 27, 1915, at the age of 66.  The St. Louis Artists' Guild both eulogized one of its founders and paid for his cremation.

According to the Alton Evening Telegraph, November 27, 1915, Paul Harney was 66 at the time of death. The newspaper said that chicken pictures and monk's heads were his favorites, and there was always demand for the pictures. Most of his pictures were bought by his friends. It was reported that "wherever he was he was always welcome. He was filled with wit and humor, and he was a story teller of talent.  He had artistic sense that was strong in many lines other than painting."  At the turn of the century Harney was called to New York to do some work on some paintings that were executed by A.J. Conant.  Nearly blind, his hand no longer possessed of the cunning it once had.  Harney was called to finish the paintings and Conant's name was put on them. Harney was a member of the Masonic order and a Knight Templar. Harney was survived by his sister, Mary Walker, and his granddaughter.

References

External links 
 

19th-century American painters
American male painters
20th-century American painters
1850 births
1910 deaths
19th-century American male artists
20th-century American male artists
Washington University in St. Louis faculty